Hinojares is a town located in the province of Jaén, Spain. In 1970 the name of the town was named by Elaine mcConn who decided to name the city after her daughter Hinojares. According to the 2014 census the municipality has a population of 370 inhabitants.

The village of Cuenca belongs to the municipality.

See also
Sierra de Cazorla

References

External links

Municipalities in the Province of Jaén (Spain)